Elections for the Pennsylvania House of Representatives were held on November 5, 2002, with all districts being contested. State Representatives are elected for two-year terms, with the entire House of Representatives up for a vote every two years. The term of office for those elected in 2002 ran from January 7, 2003 until November 30, 2004. Necessary primary elections were held on May 21, 2002.

This was the first Pennsylvania House of Representatives election held after the constitutionally-mandated decennial reapportionment plan.

Make-Up of the House

Notable elections

Special election for the 100th legislative district
A special election for the 100th legislative district was held on 2056, following the April resignation of Republican John Barley, who had been the third highest ranking Republican in the House and Chairman of the House Appropriations Committee. He had first announced his intention to retire in early 2002, only to change his mind in March when he unexpectedly showed up at a local party committee meeting, where he received the Republican Party endorsement.

Special election for the 2nd legislative district
A special election for the 2nd legislative district was held on August 14, 2001, following the May 2001 death of Italo Cappabianca. The local Democratic committee controversially endorsed Gayle Wright over Cappabianca's widow, Linda. Cappabianca decided against mounting a formal write-in campaign, citing time constraints, but encouraged voters to write her in as an independent candidate. Wright won the August 14 contest with 48.2% of the vote, with Cappabianca placing a strong second with 39.1%.

Special election for the 149th legislative district
A special election for the 149th legislative district was held on February 12, 2002 following the resignation of Democrat Constance H. Williams, who was elected to represent the 17th senatorial district in the Pennsylvania Senate. In that election, Republican Wallis Brooks narrowly defeated Democrat Daylin Leach. Brooks finished the remainder of Williams' term before losing a re-match to Daylin Leach in the 2002 general election.

Special election for the 176th legislative district
A special election for the 176th legislative district was held on April 23, 2002 following the resignation of Christopher Wogan, who was elected a judge of the Philadelphia County Court of Common Pleas in November 2001. Per the legislative redistricting plan enacted in 2001, the 176th district was moved from Philadelphia County to Monroe County. In that election, Republican Monroe County Commissioner Mario Scavello defeated Democrat Joseph Battisto, who had represented the nearby 189th legislative from 1983 until his defeat in 2000.

A special election for the 28th legislative district was held on June 26, 2001, following the resignation of Jane Orie, who was elected in March 2001 to represent the 40th senatorial district in the Pennsylvania Senate. Republican Mike Turzai, an attorney and former member of the Bradford Woods councilman, defeated Democrat Thomas Dancison by a 3-1 margin and captured every precinct in the reliably Republican suburban Pittsburgh district. This was the second election for Turzai, who unsuccessfully challenged Congressman Ron Klink in 1998.

Primary elections
In the primary election held on May 21, 2002, four incumbent legislators (two Republicans and two Democrats) lost their party's nomination. In the 19th legislative district, Democratic incumbent William Russell Robinson was defeated by Jake Wheatley, a staffer for Pittsburgh City Councilman Sala Udin, a Robinson rival. The Robinson campaign was criticized for a weak effort, finishing the election with cash left over.

In the 2nd legislative district, Democratic Gayle Wright, who had been elected in a 2001 special election, lost to Florindo Fabrizio. In the 97th legislative district, Republican Jere Strittmatter lost a surprising upset to Manheim Township Supervisor Roy Baldwin. In the 98th legislative district, Republican Thomas E. Armstrong lost to Lancaster County Clerk of Courts David Hickernell.

Retirements
Four seats left open by Democratic retirements were kept by Democrats, with Vince Biancucci succeeding Nick Colafella, Marc J. Gergely succeeding Tom Michlovic, Nick Kotik succeeding Fred A. Trello, and Neal Goodman succeeding Edward J. Lucyk. Seven seats left open by Republican retirements were filled by other Republicans, with Scott W. Boyd succeeding Jere W. Schuler, Martin T. Causer succeeding Kenneth M. Jadlowiec, C. Adam Harris succeeding Daniel F. Clark, Mauree Gingrich succeeding Edward H. Krebs, Douglas G. Reichley succeeding Jane S. Baker, and Scott A. Petri succeeding Roy Reinard. Long-time Representative Frank Tulli retired shortly after winning the Republican nomination in the May primary. Fellow Republican John Payne took his place on the November ballot, winning easily.

Three Western Pennsylvania incumbent Democrats retired after their districts were moved to the eastern portion of the state during the decennial redistricting process. All three of these seats were captured by Republicans. Democrat David Mayernik had his district, the 29th legislative district, "diced" into seven other districts and moved across the state from Allegheny County to Bucks County, Pennsylvania. Democratic leaders were unhappy that he had crossed party lines and otherwise disobeying caucus leaders. This newly reconfigured seat was captured by Bernie O'Neill, a Bucks County Republican. Democrat Ralph Kaiser retired when the 41st legislative district was moved from Allegheny County to Lancaster County, which was retribution by the House Democratic caucus for his fiscally conservative voting pattern. The seat was taken by Katie True, who had previously represented the 37th legislative district, a seat she gave up in 2000 to run for Pennsylvania Auditor General. Democrat Leo Trich's Washington County-based district, the 47th legislative district, was moved to York County, where it was captured by Republican Keith J. Gillespie.

62nd legislative district
In the 62nd legislative district, incumbent Democrat Sara Steelman was upset by Dave L. Reed, a 24-year-old Republican. Both candidates made improving the local economic climate part of their platforms. Steelman had become a GOP target after " alienating" some in her home district. As a challenger, Reed followed the campaign blueprint established in 2000 by when young Jeff Coleman defeated Tim Pesci in nearby Armstrong County. Reed raised $120,000 for the campaign and knocked on 11,000 doors in the district. During the campaign, Steelman "erupted" on the district's airwaves with taxpayer-funded "public service announcements" for the first time in a decade. With the 57-43 victory, Reed became the youngest member of the House.

149th legislative district
In the 149th legislative district, Republican incumbent Wallis Brooks, who had been elected in February, lost to Democrat Daylin Leach in a rematch of their February special election. The Brooks campaign sent dozens of direct mail advertisements, including one accusing Leach of defending child molesters as an attorney. On the Saturday before the election, one was sent to voters accusing Leach, a practicing Orthodox Jew who lost family in the Holocaust, of being anti-Semitic. The mailer carried a bold headline of "Anti-Semitism, Neo-Nazism, Holocaust Denial. They are not 'a big joke.'" The incendiary charges stemmed from Leach's 1999 defense of an in absentia client from Texas who was sued in Allentown, Pennsylvania for comments allegedly made in an Internet chat room. Following the dismissal, the plaintiff took to the internet and posted diatribes denouncing Leach and the Texas man as anti-Semites that were unearthed by a Brooks researcher and used in the mailer. "She had to know I was Jewish, because it had come up in a debate. But since I have a non-Jewish surname, she apparently thought she could get away with this," Leach said. The campaign immediately convinced a local Jewish newspaper to denounce the mailer and reproduced the article on a flyer with a profile of Leach, emphasizing his Jewish roots and activism, on the reverse. By election day, 70 volunteers had hand-delivered the literature to most district households. Leach won the election by over 1,000 votes.

150th legislative district
In the 150th legislative district, Republican-turned Democrat John A. Lawless was defeated by Republican Jacqueline Crahalla by 62 votes. Both candidates easily won their respective party's nomination in the primary election. The district was designed to be disadvantageous to Lawless, who had run afoul of the Republican Caucus leadership. In September, Lawless caused a controversy when he was pulled over for a minor traffic violation by a Lower Providence Township, Pennsylvania police officer. Lawless used vulgar language to berated the officer and threatened the police department with a loss of state funds. Following the loss, Lawless destroyed many constituent-related documents, rather than surrender them to Crahalla.

General election

References
 
 
 

2002 Pennsylvania elections
2002
Pennsylvania House of Representatives